Peter Donald McGlashan (born 22 June 1979) is a former cricketer who represented New Zealand in 11 Twenty20 Internationals and four One Day Internationals. A right-handed wicket-keeper-batsman, he played for Northern Districts in domestic cricket. He is the brother of women's cricketer Sara McGlashan.

Retirement
In 2012 he retired from cricket and took a full-time job as the director of sport and wellbeing for the Glenn Family Foundation. In the 2019 New Zealand local elections, he stood for the Labour Party in the Maungakiekie-Tāmaki Local Board and was elected.

References

External links
 
 
 Peter McGlashan Official Blog from Cricket Web

1979 births
Living people
Central Districts cricketers
Northern Districts cricketers
Otago cricketers
New Zealand cricketers
New Zealand One Day International cricketers
New Zealand Twenty20 International cricketers
Cricketers from Napier, New Zealand
New Zealand Māori cricket team players
Wicket-keepers
Local politicians in New Zealand